Bill Yeomans (born in Sydney, New South Wales) is an Australian former rugby league footballer for the St. George Dragons in the New South Wales Rugby League premiership competition.

Before making his first grade debut Yeomans was for a long time the captain of the Dragons reserve side. A quick winger, he often found it hard to break into the superstar St. George side of the 1960s, and eventually moved to Newcastle to become the captain-coach of the Maitland club where he guided his side to the title in 1965.

References

Australian rugby league coaches
Rugby league players from Sydney
St. George Dragons players
Year of birth missing (living people)
Living people
Rugby league wingers